The Morelos mine is one of the largest gold mines in Mexico. The mine is located in the south of the country in Guerrero. The mine has estimated reserves of 3.07 million ounces of gold.

References 

Gold mines in Mexico